Steimbke is a municipality in the district Nienburg, in Lower Saxony, Germany. It is situated approximately 12 km east of Nienburg, and 40 km northwest of Hanover, in a swamp and heathland, whereas the Blindesee takes centre stage.

Policy

Municipality of Steimbke
The villages Steimbke, Wendenborstel, Glashof, Eckelshof, Lichtenhorst, Lichtenmoor, and Sonnenborstel comprise the municipality of Steimbke. Steimbke is also the seat of the ("collective municipality") Steimbke.

Municipal council
The municipal council Steimbke has 12 members elected and a mayor elected directly. Since the local election on 10 September 2006, two parties and one Wählergemeinschaft represent it.
 CDU - 7 seats
 SPD - 2 seats
 WG Steimbke - 4 seats

History
 First Steimbke document is from 1175.
 During the Thirty Years' War Steimbke was taken by catholic Tilly temporarily.

In development of the village, the industrial union "Gewerkschaft Brigitta" had the greatest share in 1934 by beginning oil production. "Brigitta" established an estate for industrial workers with bounteous sports facilities, a stadion with flood light and an indoor- as well as an outdoor swimming pool. In the meantime, the reduction of oil production has resulted to the abolishment of the pumpjacks that in former times have been Steimbke's landmark.
As of 30 June 2005, Steimbke had a population of 2.739.

References

External links
Official Web site (German)
Sports club Steimbke (German)
Steimbke auxiliary firefighters (German)

Nienburg (district)